The Arizona Diamondbacks' 2007 season started with the Diamondbacks attempting to win the NL West Division. The Arizona Diamondbacks' biggest move in the offseason was when, on January 9, 2007, they got their 2001 World Series co-MVP back, pitcher Randy Johnson after making a blockbuster deal with the New York Yankees, sending to New York relief pitcher Luis Vizcaíno and three other prospects. However, Johnson suffered from injuries and underwent season-ending surgery in early August. Despite Johnson's absence and the fact they had fewer runs scored (712) than runs allowed (732), the Diamondbacks had the best record in the National League (90-72), notching their first National League West title since 2002 and their first winning record since 2003.

Regular season

League standings

National League West

Record vs. opponents

Roster

Game log

|- style="background-color:#bbffbb"
| 1 || April 2 || @ Rockies || 8 - 6 || Cruz (1-0) || Hawkins (0-1) || Valverde (1) || 48,169 || 1-0
|- style="background-color:#ffbbbb"
| 2 || April 3 || @ Rockies || 4 - 3  || Kim (1-0) || Valverde (0-1) || || 20,547 || 1-1
|- style="background-color:#ffbbbb"
| 3 || April 4 || @ Rockies || 11 - 4 || López (1-0) || Davis (0-1) || || 19,352 || 1-2
|- style="background-color:#bbffbb"
| 4 || April 5 || @ Nationals || 4 - 3 || González (1-0) || Bergmann (0-1) || Valverde (2) || 16,017 || 2-2
|- style="background-color:#bbffbb"
| 5 || April 6 || @ Nationals || 7 - 1 || Owings (1-0) || Williams (0-1) || || 19,234 || 3-2
|- style="background-color:#bbffbb"
| 6 || April 7 || @ Nationals || 7 - 1 || Webb (1-0) || Patterson (0-2) || || 16,617 || 4-2
|- style="background-color:#bbffbb"
| 7 || April 8 || @ Nationals || 3 - 1 || Hernández (1-0) || Hill (0-2)  || Valverde (3) || 17,244 || 5-2
|- style="background-color:#bbffbb"
| 8 || April 9 || Reds || 3 - 2 || Lyon (1-0) || Saarloos (0-1) || Valverde (4) || 41,803 || 6-2
|- style="background-color:#bbffbb"
| 9 || April 10 || Reds || 5 - 4  || Cruz (2-0) || Weathers (0-1) || || 21,225 || 7-2
|- style="background-color:#ffbbbb"
| 10 || April 11 || Reds || 3 - 2 || Belisle (2-0) || Owings (1-1) || Weathers (3) || 19,534 || 7-3
|- style="background-color:#ffbbbb"
| 11 || April 13 || Rockies || 6 - 3 || Affeldt (1-0) || Webb (1-1) || Fuentes (2) || 20,219 || 7-4
|- style="background-color:#bbffbb"
| 12 || April 14 || Rockies || 5 - 4 || Lyon (2-0) || Hawkins (0-3) || Valverde (5) || 27,721 || 8-4
|- style="background-color:#bbffbb"
| 13 || April 15 || Rockies || 6 - 4 || Davis (1-1) || Kim (1-2) || Valverde (6) || 21,904 || 9-4
|- style="background-color:#ffbbbb"
| 14 || April 16 || Dodgers || 5 - 1 || Penny (3-0) || González (1-1) || || 27,427 || 9-5
|- style="background-color:#ffbbbb"
| 15 || April 17 || Dodgers || 6 - 4 || Billingsley (1-0) || Peña (0-1) || Saito (6) || 25,735 || 9-6
|- style="background-color:#bbffbb"
| 16 || April 18 || @ Padres || 5 - 2  || Peña (1-1) || Thompson (0-1) || Valverde (7) || 26,872 || 10-6
|- style="background-color:#ffbbbb"
| 17 || April 19 || @ Padres || 11 - 6 || Peavy (3-0) || Hernández (1-1) || || 32,224 || 10-7
|- style="background-color:#ffbbbb"
| 18 || April 20 || @ Giants || 4 - 2 || Ortiz (2-1) || Davis (1-2) || Benítez (3) || 39,010 || 10-8
|- style="background-color:#ffbbbb"
| 19 || April 21 || @ Giants || 1 - 0 || Zito (2-2) || González (1-2) || Benítez (4) || 36,281 || 10-9
|- style="background-color:#ffbbbb"
| 20 || April 22 || @ Giants || 2 - 1 || Cain (1-1) || Petit (0-1) || || 36,868 || 10-10
|- style="background-color:#ffbbbb"
| 21 || April 24 || Padres || 10 - 5 || Wells (1-1) || Johnson (0-1) || Hoffman (4) || 19,508 || 10-11
|- style="background-color:#bbffbb"
| 22 || April 25 || Padres || 3 - 2 || Peña (2-1) || Hoffman (1-1) || || 18,307 || 11-11
|- style="background-color:#bbffbb"
| 23 || April 26 || Padres || 7 - 4 || Hernández (2-1) || Young (2-2) || Valverde (8) || 16,792 || 12-11
|- style="background-color:#bbffbb"
| 24 || April 27 || Giants || 3 - 2 || Davis (2-2) || Zito (2-3) || Valverde (9) || 24,798 || 13-11
|- style="background-color:#bbffbb"
| 25 || April 28 || Giants || 5 - 4 || Nippert (1-0) || Chulk (0-1) || Valverde (10) || 32,147 || 14-11
|- style="background-color:#bbffbb"
| 26 || April 29 || Giants || 5 - 4 || Medders (1-0) || Morris (3-1) || Lyon (1) || 28,818 || 15-11
|- style="background-color:#bbffbb"
| 27 || April 30 || @ Dodgers || 9 - 1 || Webb (2-1) || Wolf (3-3) || || 53,126 || 16-11

|- style="background-color:#ffbbbb"
| 28 || May 1 || @ Dodgers || 2 - 1 || Saito (1-0) || Lyon (2-1) || || 36,029 || 16-12
|- style="background-color:#ffbbbb"
| 29 || May 2 || @ Dodgers || 2 - 1 || Hendrickson (2-0) || Davis (2-3) || Saito (8) || 34,825 || 16-13
|- style="background-color:#ffbbbb"
| 30 || May 3 || Mets || 9 - 4 || Heilman (2-2) || Valverde (0-2) || || 19,710 || 16-14
|- style="background-color:#ffbbbb"
| 31 || May 4 || Mets || 5 - 3 || Maine (5-0) || Johnson (0-2) || Wagner (6) || 26,268 || 16-15
|- style="background-color:#ffbbbb"
| 32 || May 5 || Mets || 6 - 2 || Sosa (1-0) || Webb (2-2) || || 30,339 || 16-16
|- style="background-color:#bbffbb"
| 33 || May 6 || Mets || 3 - 1 || Hernández (3-1) || Pelfrey (0-4) || Valverde (11) || 35,363 || 17-16
|- style="background-color:#bbffbb"
| 34 || May 7 || Phillies || 4 - 3 || Lyon (3-1) || Rosario (0-2) || Valverde (12) || 19,592 || 18-16
|- style="background-color:#bbffbb"
| 35 || May 8 || Phillies || 3 - 2 || Owings (2-1) || Eaton (3-3) || Peña (1) || 22,888 || 19-16
|- style="background-color:#ffbbbb"
| 36 || May 9 || Phillies || 9 - 3 || Moyer (4-2) || Medders (1-1) || Myers (3) || 25,286 || 19-17
|- style="background-color:#bbffbb"
| 37 || May 11 || @ Astros || 3 - 1 || Webb (3-2) || Sampson (3-3) || || 36,080 || 20-17
|- style="background-color:#ffbbbb"
| 38 || May 12 || @ Astros || 10 - 4 || Oswalt (6-2) || Hernández (3-2) || || 36,142 || 20-18
|- style="background-color:#ffbbbb"
| 39 || May 13 || @ Astros || 5 - 2 || Rodríguez (1-3) || Davis (2-4) || || 37,230 || 20-19
|- style="background-color:#bbffbb"
| 40 || May 15 || @ Rockies || 3 - 0 || Johnson (1-2) ||Hirsh (2-4) || Valverde (13) || 20,178 || 21-19
|- style="background-color:#ffbbbb"
| 41 || May 16 || @ Rockies || 5 - 3 || Cook (3-1) || Webb (3-3) || Fuentes (10) || 20,023 || 21-20
|- style="background-color:#bbffbb"
| 42 || May 17 || @ Rockies || 3 - 1 || Hernández (4-2) || Fogg (1-5) || Valverde (14) || 23,610 || 22-20
|- style="background-color:#ffbbbb"
| 43 || May 18 || @ Pirates || 11 - 5 || Snell (4-2) || Davis (2-5) || || 32,682 || 22-21
|- style="background-color:#bbffbb"
| 44 || May 19 || @ Pirates || 9 - 8 || Slaten (1-0) || Capps (2-2)|| Valverde (15) || 30,677 || 23-21
|- style="background-color:#bbffbb"
| 45 || May 20 || @ Pirates || 5 - 2 || Johnson (2-2) || Maholm (2-6) || Valverde (16) || 24,282 || 24-21
|- style="background-color:#bbffbb"
| 46 || May 21 || Rockies || 6 - 5 || Slaten (2-0) || Affeldt (1-1) || Valverde (17) || 19,782 || 25-21
|- style="background-color:#ffbbbb"
| 47 || May 22 || Rockies || 3 - 1 || Corpas (1-2) || Lyon (3-2) || Fuentes (11) || 23,058 || 25-22
|- style="background-color:#ffbbbb"
| 48 || May 23 || Rockies || 2 - 0 || Francis (3-4) || Davis (2-6) || Fuentes (13) || 18,373 || 25-23
|- style="background-color:#bbffbb"
| 49 || May 24 || Astros || 9 - 1 || Owings (3-1) || Rodríguez (2-4) || || 18,130 || 26-23
|- style="background-color:#bbffbb"
| 50 || May 25 || Astros || 13 - 3 || González (2-2) || Williams (1-7) || || 23,298 || 27-23
|- style="background-color:#bbffbb"
| 51 || May 26 || Astros || 5 - 4 || Webb (4-3) || Sampson (4-5) || Valverde (18) || 27,836 || 28-23
|- style="background-color:#bbffbb"
| 52 || May 27 || Astros || 8 - 4 || Hernández (5-2) || Oswalt (6-4) || || 26,621 || 29-23
|- style="background-color:#bbffbb"
| 53 || May 28 || @ Phillies  || 5 - 4 || Davis (3-6) || García (1-4) || Lyon (2) || 41,985 || 30-23
|- style="background-color:#bbffbb"
| 54 || May 29 || @ Phillies  || 11 - 5 || Owings (4-1) || Lieber (2-3) || || 27,643 || 31-23
|- style="background-color:#bbffbb"
| 55 || May 30 || @ Phillies  || 4 - 3 || Johnson (3-2) || Moyer (5-4) || Valverde (19) || 33,281 || 32-23

|- style="background-color:#bbffbb"
| 56 || June 1 || @ Mets  || 5 - 1 || Webb (5-3) || Maine (6-3) || || 40,230 || 33-23
|- style="background-color:#ffbbbb"
| 57 || June 2 || @ Mets  || 7 - 1 || Sosa (5-1) || Hernández (5-3) || || 45,219 || 33-24
|- style="background-color:#bbffbb"
| 58 || June 3 || @ Mets  || 4 - 1 || Davis (4-6) || Pérez (6-4) || Valverde (20) || 53,012 || 34-24
|- style="background-color:#bbffbb"
| 59 || June 5 || Giants  || 4 - 3  || Lyon (4-2) || Correia (1-3) || || 25,848 || 35-24
|- style="background-color:#bbffbb"
| 60 || June 6 || Giants  || 1 - 0 || Webb (6-3) || Morris (6-3) || Valverde (21) || 24,398 || 36-24
|- style="background-color:#ffbbbb"
| 61 || June 7 || Giants  || 5 - 4  || Taschner (1-0) || Medders (1-2) || Kline (1) || 21,984 || 36-25
|- style="background-color:#ffbbbb"
| 62 || June 8 || Red Sox  || 10 - 3 || Beckett (9-0) || Davis (4-7) || || 40,435 || 36-26
|- style="background-color:#ffbbbb"
| 63 || June 9 || Red Sox  || 4 - 3  || Okajima (2-0) || Cruz (2-1) || Papelbon (14) || 49,826 || 36-27
|- style="background-color:#bbffbb"
| 64 || June 10 || Red Sox  || 5 - 1 || Johnson (4-2) || Matsuzaka (7-5) || || 46,622 || 37-27
|- style="background-color:#ffbbbb"
| 65 || June 12 || @ Yankees  || 4 - 1 || Wang (6-4) || Webb (6-4) || Rivera (8) || 51,577 || 37-28
|- style="background-color:#ffbbbb"
| 66 || June 13 || @ Yankees  || 7 - 2 || Mussina (3-3) || Hernández (5-4) || || 53,891 || 37-29
|- style="background-color:#ffbbbb"
| 67 || June 14 || @ Yankees  || 7 - 1 || Pettitte (4-4) || Davis (4-8) || || 53,712 || 37-30
|- style="background-color:#bbffbb"
| 68 || June 15 || @ Orioles  || 7 - 3 || Slaten (3-0) || Williams (0-2) || || 26,174 || 38-30
|- style="background-color:#bbffbb"
| 69 || June 16 || @ Orioles  || 8 - 4 || González (3-2) || Cabrera (5-8) || || 26,964 || 39-30
|- style="background-color:#bbffbb"
| 70 || June 17 || @ Orioles  || 6 - 4  || Webb (7-4) || Bradford (0-4) || Valverde (22) || 27,934 || 40-30
|- style="background-color:#ffbbbb"
| 71 || June 18 || Devil Rays  || 10 - 2 || Hammel (1-0) || Hernández (5-5) || || 18,963 || 40-31
|- style="background-color:#bbffbb"
| 72 || June 19 || Devil Rays  || 10 - 8  || Lyon (5-2) || Reyes (1-1) || || 19,761 || 41-31
|- style="background-color:#bbffbb"
| 73 || June 20 || Devil Rays  || 7 - 4 || Owings (5-1) || Shields (6-2) || Valverde (23) || 31,805 || 42-31
|- style="background-color:#ffbbbb"
| 74 || June 22 || Orioles  || 7 - 1 || Cabrera (6-8) || Webb (7-5) ||  || 21,722 || 42-32
|- style="background-color:#bbffbb"
| 75 || June 23 || Orioles  || 7 - 4 || Cruz (3-1) || Bell (0-1) || Valverde (24) || 29,832 || 43-32
|- style="background-color:#bbffbb"
| 76 || June 24 || Orioles  || 8 - 3 || Davis (5-8) || Trachsel (5-6) || || 27,744 || 44-32
|- style="background-color:#ffbbbb"
| 77 || June 25 || Dodgers  || 8 - 1 || Penny (10-1) || Owings (5-2) || || 24,966 || 44-33
|- style="background-color:#ffbbbb"
| 78 || June 26 || Dodgers  || 6 - 5 || Broxton (3-2) ||  Slaten (3-1) || Saito (21) || 28,734 || 44-34
|- style="background-color:#bbffbb"
| 79 || June 27 || Dodgers  || 2 - 0 || Webb (8-4) || Lowe (8-7) || Valverde (25) || 26,867 || 45-34
|- style="background-color:#ffbbbb"
| 80 || June 28 || Dodgers  || 9 - 5 || Wolf (9-6) || Johnson (4-3) || Saito (22) || 26,526 || 45-35
|- style="background-color:#bbffbb"
| 81 || June 29 || @ Giants  || 4 - 3  || Peña (3-1) || Hennessey (1-3) || Valverde (26) || 39,146 || 46-35
|- style="background-color:#ffbbbb"
| 82 || June 30 || @ Giants  || 4 - 1 || Lowry (8-6) || Davis (5-9) || Hennessey (4) || 41,515 || 46-36

|- style="background-color:#ffbbbb"
| 83 || July 1 || @ Giants  || 13 - 0 || Lincecum (3-2) || Owings (5-3) || || 42,154 || 46-37
|- style="background-color:#ffbbbb"
| 84 || July 2 || @ Cardinals  || 11 - 3 || Springer (4-1) || Webb (8-6) || || 42,312 || 46-38
|- style="background-color:#bbffbb"
| 85 || July 3 || @ Cardinals  || 7 - 1 || Petit (1-1) || Wellemeyer (2-2) || || 42,127 || 47-38
|- style="background-color:#ffbbbb"
| 86 || July 4 || @ Cardinals  || 5 - 4 || Franklin (3-0) || Lyon (5-3) || Isringhausen (16) || 43,538 || 47-39
|- style="background-color:#ffbbbb"
| 87 || July 5 || @ Cardinals  || 3 - 2 || Wainwright (7-7) || Davis (5-10) || Isringhausen (17) || 42,184 || 47-40
|- style="background-color:#ffbbbb"
| 88 || July 6 || @ Reds  || 8 - 1 || Lohse (5-10) || Owings (5-4) || || 20,445 || 47-41
|- style="background-color:#ffbbbb"
| 89 || July 7 || @ Reds  || 5 - 4 || Coutlangus (4-1) || Peña (3-2) || Weathers (17) || 34,410 || 47-42
|- style="background-color:#ffbbbb"
| 90 || July 8 || @ Reds  || 4 - 3 || Saarloos (1-4) || Valverde (0-3) || || 28,169 || 47-43
|- style="background-color:#bbffbb"
| 91 || July 13 || Padres  || 8 - 3 || Davis (6-10) || Maddux (7-7) || || 30,981 || 48-43
|- style="background-color:#bbffbb"
| 92 || July 14 || Padres  || 5 - 4 || Lyon (6-3) || Linebrink (2-2) || Valverde (27) || 36,833 || 49-43
|- style="background-color:#ffbbbb"
| 93 || July 15 || Padres  || 4 - 0 || Germano (6-3) || Webb (8-7) || || 30,343 || 49-44
|- style="background-color:#ffbbbb"
| 94 || July 16 || @ Brewers  || 4 - 3 || Bush (8-7) || Owings (5-5) || Cordero (29) || 36,381 || 49-45
|- style="background-color:#ffbbbb"
| 95 || July 17 || @ Brewers  || 3 - 2 || Vargas (7-2) || Petit (1-2) || Cordero (30) || 32,540 || 49-46
|- style="background-color:#bbffbb"
| 96 || July 18 || @ Brewers  || 5 - 2 || Peña (4-2) || Balfour (0-1) || Valverde (28) || 30,247 || 50-46
|- style="background-color:#ffbbbb"
| 97 || July 19 || @ Brewers  || 10 - 1 || Gallardo (2-1) || Hernández (5-6) || Wise (1) || 41,156 || 50-47
|- style="background-color:#ffbbbb"
| 98 || July 20 || @ Cubs || 6 - 2 || Marquis (7-5) || Webb (8-8) || || 41,071 || 50-48
|- style="background-color:#bbffbb"
| 99 || July 21 || @ Cubs  || 3 - 2 || Cruz (4-1) || Howry (5-5) || Valverde (29) || 41,632 || 51-48
|- style="background-color:#bbffbb"
| 100 || July 22 || @ Cubs  || 3 - 0 || Petit (2-2) || Marshall (4-4) || Valverde (30) || 41,705 || 52-48
|- style="background-color:#bbffbb"
| 101 || July 23 || Marlins  || 4 - 3 || Davis (7-10) || Willis (7-10) || Valverde (31) || 19,620 || 53-48
|- style="background-color:#bbffbb"
| 102 || July 24 || Marlins  || 9 - 3 || Hernández (6-6) || Mitre (4-5) || || 21,035 || 54-48
|- style="background-color:#bbffbb"
| 103 || July 25 || Marlins  || 7 - 0 || Webb (9-8) || Olsen (8-8) || || 20,154 || 55-48
|- style="background-color:#bbffbb"
| 104 || July 26 || Marlins  || 7 - 4 || Peña (5-2) || Benítez (2-6) || || 18,721 || 56-48
|- style="background-color:#bbffbb"
| 105 || July 27 || Braves  || 8 - 7  || González (4-2) || Ledezma (0-2) || || 27,151 || 57-48
|- style="background-color:#bbffbb"
| 106 || July 28 || Braves  || 4 - 3  || Cruz (5-1) || Yates (2-3) || || 33,664 || 58-48
|- style="background-color:#ffbbbb"
| 107 || July 29 || Braves  || 14 - 0 || Hudson (11-5) || Hernández (6-7) || || 30,535 || 58-49
|- style="background-color:#bbffbb"
| 108 || July 31 || @ Padres  || 4 - 0 || Webb (10-8) || Germano (6-6) || || 32,086 || 59-49

|- style="background-color:#bbffbb"
| 109 || August 1 || @ Padres  || 9 - 5  || Valverde (1-3) || Bell (4-3) || || 30,416 || 60-49
|- style="background-color:#ffbbbb"
| 110 || August 2 || @ Padres  || 11 - 0 || Peavy (11-5) || Petit (2-3) || || 37,119 || 60-50
|- style="background-color:#bbffbb"
| 111 || August 3 || @ Dodgers  || 1 - 0 || Davis (8-10) || Billingsley (7-2) || Valverde (32) || 51,582 || 61-50
|- style="background-color:#bbffbb"
| 112 || August 4 || @ Dodgers  || 8 - 7 || Hernández (7-7) ||  Lowe (8-10) || Valverde (33) || 52,921 || 62-50
|- style="background-color:#bbffbb"
| 113 || August 5 || @ Dodgers  || 3 - 0 || Webb (11-8) || Penny (13-3) || || 48,803 || 63-50
|- style="background-color:#ffbbbb"
| 114 || August 7 || Pirates  || 8 - 3 || Gorzelanny (10-6) || Owings (5-6) || || 25,340 || 63-51
|- style="background-color:#bbffbb"
| 115 || August 8 || Pirates  || 10 - 6 || González (5-2) || Maholm (7-14) || Valverde (34) || 23,082 || 64-51
|- style="background-color:#bbffbb"
| 116 || August 9 || Pirates  || 4 - 2 || Davis (9-10) || Chacón (4-3) || Valverde (35) || 22,316 || 65-51
|- style="background-color:#bbffbb"
| 117 || August 10 || Nationals  || 11 - 4 || Hernández (8-7) || Rivera (4-4) || || 31,110 || 66-51
|- style="background-color:#bbffbb"
| 118 || August 11 || Nationals  || 1 - 0 || Webb (12-8) || Lannan (1-1) || || 32,121 || 67-51
|- style="background-color:#ffbbbb"
| 119 || August 12 || Nationals  || 7 - 6 || Rauch (8-2) || Valverde (1-4) || Cordero (26) || 29,839 || 67-52
|- style="background-color:#ffbbbb"
| 120 || August 14 || @ Marlins  || 14 - 5  || Willis (8-12) || Kim (6-6) || || 10,610 || 67-53
|- style="background-color:#bbffbb"
| 121 || August 15 || @ Marlins  || 9 - 6 || Davis (10-10) || Mitre (5-6) || Valverde (36) || 11,472 || 68-53
|- style="background-color:#bbffbb"
| 122 || August 16 || @ Marlins  || 5 - 4 || Hernández (9-7) || Barone (0-1) || Valverde (37) || 11,516 || 69-53
|- style="background-color:#bbffbb"
| 123 || August 17 || @ Braves  || 4 - 0 || Webb (13-8) || Cormier (0-3) || || 33,248 || 70-53
|- style="background-color:#bbffbb"
| 124 || August 18 || @ Braves  || 12 - 6 || Owings (6-6) || Carlyle (7-5) || || 48,643 || 71-53
|- style="background-color:#ffbbbb"
| 125 || August 19 || @ Braves  || 6 - 2 || Smoltz (11-6) || Petit (2-4) || || 30,818 || 71-54
|- style="background-color:#ffbbbb"
| 126 || August 20 || Brewers  || 9 - 0 || Gallardo (5-3) || Davis (10-11) || Villanueva (1) || 26,900 || 71-55
|- style="background-color:#ffbbbb"
| 127 || August 21 || Brewers  || 7 - 4 || Bush (10-9) || Hernández (9-8) || Cordero (37) || 27,784 || 71-56
|- style="background-color:#bbffbb"
| 128 || August 22 || Brewers  || 3 - 2 || Webb (14-8) || Suppan (8-11) || Valverde (38) || 31,720 || 72-56
|- style="background-color:#ffbbbb"
| 129 || August 24 || Cubs  || 6 - 2 || Marshall (7-6)|| Owings (6-7) || Dempster (21) || 36,700 || 72-57
|- style="background-color:#bbffbb"
| 130 || August 25 || Cubs  || 3 - 1 || Davis (11-11) || Lilly (13-7) || Valverde (39) || 46,173 || 73-57
|- style="background-color:#bbffbb"
| 131 || August 26 || Cubs  || 5 - 4 || González (6-2) || Marquis (10-8) || Valverde (40) || 38,902 || 74-57
|- style="background-color:#ffbbbb"
| 132 || August 27 || @ Padres  || 3 - 1 || Peavy (15-5) || Hernández (9-9) || Hoffman (34) || 25,763 || 74-58
|- style="background-color:#ffbbbb"
| 133 || August 28 || @ Padres  || 6 - 4 || Germano (7-7) || Webb (14-9) || Hoffman (35) || 23,006 || 74-59
|- style="background-color:#ffbbbb"
| 134 || August 29 || @ Padres  || 3 - 1 || Cameron (2-0) || Slaten (3-2) || Bell (2) || 29,021 || 74-60
|- style="background-color:#bbffbb"
| 135 || August 30 || @ Padres  || 8 - 7 || Davis (12-11) || Young (9-5) || Valverde (41) || 28,554 || 75-60
|- style="background-color:#ffbbbb"
| 136 || August 31 || Rockies  || 7 - 3 || Herges (3-0) || Peña (5-3) || || 26,127 || 75-61

|- style="background-color:#bbffbb"
| 137 || September 1 || Rockies  || 13 - 7 || González (7-2) || Dessens (2-2) || || 29,119 || 76-61
|- style="background-color:#ffbbbb"
| 138 || September 2 || Rockies  || 4 - 3 || Fogg (8-9) || Webb (14-10) || Corpas (12) || 26,776 || 76-62
|- style="background-color:#ffbbbb"
| 139 || September 3 || Padres  || 10 - 2 || Maddux (11-9) || Owings (6-8) || || 30,531 || 76-63
|- style="background-color:#bbffbb"
| 140 || September 4 || Padres  || 9 - 1 || Davis (13-11) || Young (9-6) || || 26,063 || 77-63
|- style="background-color:#bbffbb"
| 141 || September 5 || Padres  || 9 - 6 || Hernández (10-9) || Peavy (16-6) || Valverde (42) || 28,065 || 78-63
|- style="background-color:#bbffbb"
| 142 || September 7 || Cardinals  || 4 - 2 || Webb (15-10) || Wainwright (13-10) || Valverde (43) || 31,225 || 79-63
|- style="background-color:#bbffbb"
| 143 || September 8 || Cardinals  || 9 - 8 || Eveland (1-0) || Wellemeyer (3-3) || Valverde (44) || 45,931 || 80-63
|- style="background-color:#bbffbb"
| 144 || September 9 || Cardinals  || 6 - 5  || Petit (3-4) || Franklin (4-3) || Valverde (45) || 35,136 || 81-63
|- style="background-color:#bbffbb"
| 145 || September 10 || @ Giants  || 5 - 3 || Peguero (1-0) || Hennessey (3-5) || Peña (2) || 33,498 || 82-63
|- style="background-color:#ffbbbb"
| 146 || September 11 || @ Giants  || 2 - 1 || Walker (2-0) || Wickman (3-4) || Wilson (3) || 33,633 || 82-64
|- style="background-color:#bbffbb"
| 147 || September 12 || @ Giants  || 9 - 4 || Webb (16-10) || Sánchez (1-4) || || 37,083 || 83-64
|- style="background-color:#ffbbbb"
| 148 || September 14 || @ Dodgers  || 7 - 4 || Penny (16-4) || Davis (13-12) || Saito (39) || 54,014 || 83-65
|- style="background-color:#ffbbbb"
| 149 || September 15 || @ Dodgers  || 6 - 2 || Lowe (12-12) || Hernández (10-10) || || 48,366 || 83-66
|- style="background-color:#bbffbb"
| 150 || September 16 || @ Dodgers  || 6 - 1 || González (8-2) || Loaiza (2-2) || || 51,460 || 84-66
|- style="background-color:#ffbbbb"
| 151 || September 17 || Giants  || 8 - 5 || Munter (1-0) || Peña (5-4) || Wilson (4) || 31,122 || 84-67
|- style="background-color:#bbffbb"
| 152 || September 18 || Giants  || 5 - 0 || Owings (7-8) || Sánchez (1-5) || || 44,220 || 85-67
|- style="background-color:#bbffbb"
| 153 || September 19 || Giants  || 6 - 4 || Cruz (6-1) || Zito (9-13) || Valverde (46) || 42,855 || 86-67
|- style="background-color:#bbffbb"
| 154 || September 21 || Dodgers  || 12 - 3 || Hernández (11-10) || Loaiza (2-3) || || 37,753 || 87-67
|- style="background-color:#bbffbb"
| 155 || September 22 || Dodgers  || 6 - 2 || Webb (17-10) || Wells (8-9) || || 47,673 || 88-67
|- style="background-color:#ffbbbb"
| 156 || September 23 || Dodgers  || 7 - 1 || Billingsley (12-5) || González (8-3) || || 43,372 || 88-68
|- style="background-color:#ffbbbb"
| 157 || September 25 || @ Pirates  || 6 - 5 || Torres (2-4) || Lyon (6-4) || Capps (18) || 14,569 || 88-69
|- style="background-color:#ffbbbb"
| 158 || September 26 || @ Pirates  || 5 - 1 || Morris (10-11) || Hernández (11-11) || || 16,289 || 88-70
|- style="background-color:#bbffbb"
| 159 || September 27 || @ Pirates  || 8 - 0 || Owings (8-8) || Van Benschoten (0-7) || || 11,335 || 89-70
|- style="background-color:#bbffbb"
| 160 || September 28 || @ Rockies  || 4 - 2 || Webb (18-10) || Francis (17-9) || Valverde (47) || 48,190 || 90-70
|- style="background-color:#ffbbbb"
| 161 || September 29 || @ Rockies  || 11 - 1 || Redman (2-4) || González (8-4) || || 47,368 || 90-71
|- style="background-color:#ffbbbb"
| 162 || September 30 || @ Rockies  || 4 - 3 || Fuentes (3-5) || Nippert (1-1) || Corpas (19) || 46,375 || 90-72

|-
|

Playoffs

NLDS vs. Chicago Cubs

NLCS vs. Colorado Rockies

Player stats

Batting
Note: G=Games played; AB=At bats; R=Runs scored; H=Hits; 2B=Doubles; 3B=Triples; HR=Home runs; RBI=Runs batted in; AVG=Batting average; SB=Stolen bases

Pitching
Note: W=Wins; L=Losses; ERA=Earned run average; G=Games pitched; GS=Games started; SV=Saves; IP=Innings pitched; R=Runs allowed; ER=Earned runs allowed; BB=Walks allowed; K=Strikeouts

Farm system

References

External links
2007 Arizona Diamondbacks season at Baseball Reference
Batting Statistics: Arizona Diamondbacks Batting Stats on ESPN.com
Pitching Statistics: Arizona Diamondbacks Pitching Stats on ESPN.com

Arizona Diamondbacks seasons
Arizona Diamondbacks season
National League West champion seasons
Arizonia